Scopula attentata is a moth of the family Geometridae. It was described by Francis Walker in 1861. It is found in India, Myanmar and Taiwan.

References

Moths described in 1861
attentata
Moths of Asia
Taxa named by Francis Walker (entomologist)